Oľšavka is a village and municipality in Stropkov District in the Prešov Region of north-eastern Slovakia.

References

External links
 
 
http://www.statistics.sk/mosmis/eng/run.html

Villages and municipalities in Stropkov District
Šariš